55th Regiment of Foot may refer to:

44th (East Essex) Regiment of Foot, 55th Regiment of Foot, numbered as the 55th Foot in 1747 and renumbered as the 44th in 1751
53rd (Shropshire) Regiment of Foot, 55th Regiment of Foot, raised in 1755 and renumbered as the 53rd in 1756
55th (Westmorland) Regiment of Foot, raised as the 57th and renumbered as the 55th in 1756